The North Shore & Western Line (numbered T1, coloured orange) is a commuter rail line operated by Sydney Trains in Sydney, New South Wales, Australia. It serves the North Shore, parts of the Inner West and Western Suburbs.

It was previously the North Shore, Northern & Western Line (also numbered T1) until April 2019, when the T9 Northern Line was spun off from the original T1 line.

History
Following victory in the 2011 New South Wales election, the O'Farrell Government embarked on reform of transport in New South Wales. In November 2011, Transport for NSW was created to improve planning and coordination of transport projects and services. The organisation developed a new rail timetable and branding, which was put into effect on 20 October 2013. This saw the merger of the North Shore Line and Western Line with the Northern Line to form the North Shore, Northern & Western Line. A new numbering system was also introduced and the line was given the number T1.

The North Shore, Northern & Western Line formerly ran along the Epping to Chatswood line until it closed in September 2018 to be converted to metro standards as part of the Sydney Metro Northwest project. As a result, the traditional Northern line route from Hornsby to Central via Strathfield was reinstated. The closed section was replaced by Station Link bus services until it reopened as metro. On 28 April 2019, this route became a separate T9 Northern Line, with the T1 renamed the North Shore & Western Line.

Railway line history
The T1 uses a number of different railway lines and is the result of various schemes to link the lines together. The line is centred around the Main Suburban railway line which runs from Central to Granville, which continues as the Main Western line at Granville. The Richmond railway line branches from the Main Western line at Blacktown.

In the other direction from Central towards the North Shore, the T1 uses the North Shore Line towards Hornsby, then continues along the Main North Line towards Berowra.

Main Western and Richmond railway lines

The Main Western railway line opened to Penrith in 1863 as a branch from the junction with the Main South line at Granville. Electrification reached Parramatta in 1928 and Penrith in 1955.

A branch line was opened to Richmond in 1864 under the stewardship of engineer James Moore. Electrification from Riverstone to Richmond opened in August 1991. Through running to and from Sydney commenced in 1992.

North Shore railway line

The North Shore railway line was opened on 1 January 1890 between Hornsby and St Leonards. The line was extended to the Sydney Harbour foreshore at Milsons Point in 1893. Transport between this original Milsons Point station and central Sydney was by ferry boat. The line was electrified in 1927.

When the Sydney Harbour Bridge was opened in 1932 a new Milsons Point station (on the bridge approach) came into operation and the North Shore Line was extended through it and over the Sydney Harbour Bridge to link with the underground lines of central Sydney. The result is that the two ends of the North Shore Line link to the Sydney railway system at Central and Hornsby.

Main North railway line

The T1 uses the section of the Main North railway line between Hornsby and Berowra, which was opened in 1887 and electrified in 1959.

Route
The route passes through a number of business districts and major centres, namely Hornsby, Chatswood, North Sydney, the Central Business District, Parramatta, Blacktown and Penrith.

The line heads south from Berowra to Hornsby using the Main North Line. Trains then divert onto the North Shore Line, eventually passing through North Sydney station before heading across the Sydney Harbour Bridge, through the western limb of the City Circle and the stations of Central and Redfern. Services then run along the Main Suburban Railway, usually using the middle 'Suburban' pair of the six tracks between Redfern and Strathfield. Services do not stop at intermediate stations between Redfern and Strathfield.

Services continue west from Strathfield to Granville where trains join the Main Western Line. After passing through Parramatta, trains reach Blacktown, where the line divides in two. A western branch continues along the Main Western Line as far as Emu Plains and a north-western branch heads to Richmond using the Richmond Line.

Patronage
The following table shows the patronage of Sydney Trains network for the year ending 30 June 2022.

References

External links
Sydney Trains North Shore, Northern & Western Line timetables Transport for NSW
 Neety's Train Page - information on suburban stations.
 New South Wales Railways - historical information on suburban stations.
 New South Wales Transport Information
 Australian Railmaps - information & maps of train services & stopping patterns.
 Transport Infrastructure Development Corporation project website

Railway lines in Sydney
Standard gauge railways in Australia
Sydney Trains
Hornsby Shire